Étienne Provost (1785 – 3 July 1850) was a Canadian fur trader whose trapping and trading activities in the American southwest preceded Mexican independence. He was also known as Proveau and Provot (and the pronunciation was "Pra-vo"). Leading a company headquartered in Taos, in what is today New Mexico, he was active in the Green River drainage and the central portion of modern Utah. He may have been the first man of European descent to see the Great Salt Lake, purportedly reaching its shores around 1824–25. (Others claim that Jim Bridger, an American, was the first man of European descent to see the lake.)

Early life
Provost was born December 21, 1785, in Chambly, Quebec, son of Albert Provost and Marie Anne Menard. He was baptized December 21, 1785 at Saint-Joseph-de-Chambly Church, Chambly County, Quebec, but little is known about his early life. He made his home in St. Louis, Missouri for 10 years marveling at the Arkansas River as late 1814 with Joseph Philibert. He left there with Auguste Chouteau and Jules deMun. He was imprisoned at Santa Fe, New Mexico twice.

Santa    Fe    trade
About 1822, he returned to New Mexico as one of the early traders. He formed a partnership with a certain Leclerc to trap in the Uinta Basin.

His party was attacked by Snake Indians in October 1824 at the Jordan River near its mouth at the Great Salt Lake. Eight men were lost, but Provost survived and established trading posts on the banks of both Utah Lake and the Great Salt Lake. The Jordan River was historically named Proveau's Fork.

Provost's company of trappers preceded the men of the Rocky Mountain Fur Company in the central Rocky Mountains. In May 1825, he met Peter Skene Ogden of the Hudson's Bay Company in Weber Canyon. After returning to St. Louis in 1826, he became an employee of John Jacob Astor's American Fur Company. He continued his own trapping ventures, as well as leading AFC men on ventures on the upper Missouri River.

He married in 1829, but continued escorting AFC caravans to the annual rendezvous until 1838.

From 1839 until his death in 1850, he continued to recruit and escort the employees of the fur company and various private expeditions, including John Audubon's natural history expedition of 1843.

Legacy
Provost's activities and explorations were well known among traders and settlers in the American Southwest. The Provo River and Provo Canyon in central Utah are named for the fur trader, as is the adjacent city of Provo.

St. Louis, Missouri was home to Provost for many years prior to his death on July 3, 1850. His funeral services and burial occurred at the Old Cathedral in St. Louis.

Provost is memorialized on the This Is the Place Monument in Salt Lake City.

References
 Hafen, LeRoy R. Étienne Provost, "Fur Trappers and Traders of the Far Southwest". Utah State University Press, Logan, Utah, 1968. 
 Morgan, Dale L., "The West of William H. Ashley" (1964), 
 Morgan, Dale L. and Eleanor Harris, editors, "The Rocky Mountain Journals of William Marshall Anderson" (1967) 
 Tykal, Jack B., "Etienne Provost: Man of the Mountains" (1989) 
 Weber, David J., "The Taos Trappers: The Fur Trade in the Far Southwest", 1540-1846 (1971)

Notes

1785 births
1850 deaths
Canadian fur traders
Pre-Confederation Canadian emigrants to the United States
American people of Québécois descent
American emigrants to Mexico